Íþróttafélagið Völsungur is an Icelandic multi-sport club from the town of Húsavík located on the north coast of Iceland on the shores of Skjálfandi bay.

History
The club was founded on 12 April 1927 by 23 boys. In 1933, the first girls joined the club.

Football

Völsungur fields both men's and women's senior football teams along with junior teams.

Men's football

Current squad

Titles 
1. deild karla: 1986
2. deild karla: 1968, 1971, 1979, 1995, 2003, 2012
3. deild karla: 2009
Source

Women's football

History
In 2019, Völsungur women's team won the 2. deild kvenna and achieved promotion to the 1. deild kvenna.

Titles
2. deild kvenna: 2019
Source

References

External links
 Official Website

Football clubs in Iceland
Association football clubs established in 1927
1927 establishments in Iceland
Húsavík